This is a list of games for the PlayStation 4. The PlayStation 4 supports both physical and digital games. Physical games are sold on Blu-ray Disc and digital games can be purchased through the PlayStation Store. See Arcade Archives and Arcade Game Series for a list of emulated arcade games that have been released for the PlayStation 4, and List of PlayStation 2 games for PlayStation 4 for PlayStation 2 games running on PlayStation 4 with an emulator. See List of PlayStation VR games for a larger range of dedicated PlayStation VR games.

List
There are currently  games on this list.

See also
List of best-selling PlayStation 4 video games

Notes

References

142. PlayStation Blog Road 96 release date PlayStation Blog. 12 April 2022. Retrieved May 8, 2022.

Games
 
4 games
Playstation 4